The Northumberland Championships or Northumberland Lawn Tennis Championships or  Northumberland County Championships and later known as the ESAB Northumberland Open for sponsorship reasons was a men's and women's open grass court tennis tournament held first held at the outh Northumberland Cricket Ground and various other venues until 1923. It was then staged at the Brandling Lawn Tennis Club (1924–1974), the Northumberland Club (1974–1983), Newcastle-upon-Tyne, Northumberland, Great Britain. The tournament ran from 1882 to 1983.

History
Attempts were made establish a large annual tournament in the County of Northumberland located in North East England, which led to the creation of the first Northumberland County Championships held at the South Northumberland Cricket Ground, Gosforth, Newcastle upon Tyne, Northumberland, England in July 1882. However the tournament did not have a premenant home until 1924 when the Northumberland Lawn Tennis Ground Co Ltd was formed in order to secure permanent home for the Northumberland Open Tennis Tournament, and secondly, to provide a new permanent venue for Brandling Lawn Tennis Club, then the leading tennis club in the north east.

The Northumberland Championships ran for 101 years, and was reasonably successful in attracting attract top players to it. The championships were not staged during World War I or World War II. It continued to be staged after the start of the open era in 1968 it later became known as the Northumberland Open, longer than many other old tournaments with a great tradition. It remained a featured tournament in the annual tennis tours for a considerable time. In 1974 the host venue the Brandling Lawn tennis Club merged with the Portland Lawn Tennis Club and Osborne Lawen tennis Club to create the Northumberland Club which continued to stage the Northumberland Championships tournament.

Notable winners of the men's  singles included Joseph Bruce Ismay (1884),  Patrick Bowes-Lyon (1886–1888), Harold Mahony (1891) and William Renshaw (1893), Pat Spence (1922) Cam Malfroy (1938), Ignacy Tłoczyński (1952) and John Lloyd (1977). Previous women's singles champions included Charlotte Cooper (1895), Dorothea Douglass Chambers (1908), Anita Lizana (1935–1937) and Gem Hoahing (1948), Angela Mortimer (1951) and Judy Tegart (1968). The Northumberland Championships ran until 1983 when it was abolished.  The final men's  singles champion was Britain's Buster Mottram and the final women's singles champion was Catherine Berry.

Event names
 Northumberland County Championships (1882-1890)
 Northumberland County Lawn Tennis Championships (1891-1899)
 Northumberland Championships (1900-69) 
 Northumberland Open (1970-71)
 Greenshield Northumberland Open (1971-74)  
 ESAB Northumberland Open (1981-83)

References

Sources
 Northumberland tennis—early shocks in the Northumberland lawn tennis championships. Newcastle Journal. The British Newspaper Archive. 1 August 1961.
 Northumberland Tennis and Squash Club. 94 Years of History. www.northumberlandclub.org. Northumberland Club. Retrieved 4 October 2022.
 Robertson, Max (1974). The encyclopedia of tennis. New York. Viking Press. ISBN 9780670294084.
 Whitaker's Almanack: Volume 20. London: J Whitaker & Sons. 1888.

Grass court tennis tournaments
Defunct tennis tournaments in the United Kingdom
Tennis tournaments in England